Graham Hurley, born in 1946 at Clacton on Sea, is an English crime fiction writer.

Formerly based in Portsmouth but now relocated in the West Country, he is best known for creating the character of DI Joe Faraday, following several standalone novels. He contributed a column to The Portsmouth News. He received both a BA and an MA in English from the University of Cambridge.

He worked as a script-writer with Southern Television before becoming a researcher and later a director.  For TVS He filmed the discovery of the seabed wrecks of the Titanic and the Bismarck (with American oceanographer Robert Ballard) and produced ITV’s account of Richard Branson’s attempt to cross the Atlantic by balloon.

Bibliography

Standalone Novels

Rules of Engagement
Reaper
The Devil's Breath
Thunder in the Blood
Sabbathman
The Perfect Soldier
Heaven's Light
Nocturne
Permissible Limits

DI Joe Faraday series

Turnstone
The Take
Angels Passing
Deadlight
Cut To Black
Blood and Honey
One Under
The Price of Darkness
No Lovelier Death
Beyond Reach
Borrowed Light
Happy Days (2012)
Backstory (2012) - A collection of stories filling the back story of the series

D/S Jimmy Suttle series

Western Approaches (2012)
Touching Distance (2013)
Sins of the Father (2014)
The Order of Things (2015)

Wars Within series

Finisterre (2016)
Aurore (2017)
Estocada' (2018)Raid 42 (2019)Last Flight To Stalingrad (2020)Kyiv (2021)

Enora Andressen seriesCurtain Call (2019)Sight Unseen (2019)Off Script (2020)Limelight (2020)Intermission (2021)

Adaptations
Gétévé and France Télévisions started adapting Hurley's Faraday stories in 2011 through 90 minute television films under the title Deux Flics sur les Docks (lit. Two Cops on the Docks). Jean-Marc Barr and Bruno Solo headline the series, portraying Joe Faraday and Paul Winter respectively. By the end of 2013, six films have been produced and broadcast, adapting the novels Angels Passing, Cut To Black, One Under, Blood and Honey, Deadlight and The Take''.

References

External links
Interview with The Guardian

1946 births
English crime fiction writers
English people of Irish descent
People from Clacton-on-Sea
Writers from Portsmouth
Living people
Date of birth missing (living people)
Place of birth missing (living people)